Matiya Mahal, located at Hindaun in Rajasthan, India, is an ancient heritage of Hindaun. This magnificent building is about 150 feet long, 150 feet wide. This building is made of red sandstone. This is a three-story building. The people believe that soil and stone have been used in the past and it was constructed by a person named Matiya and named after it was Matiya Mahal.

But to study the structure inside it, it is known that the building was a horse of the fortress of horses here. The texture is similar to the horse. Here also the signs of binding elephants are clearly visible. The main door is very high but the entrance door is also high so that elephants can get out of comfort. In this case, the living rooms of the sepoys remained. There is a place beside it, which is probably the place of residence of horses and elephants.

it is a very ancient castle. It is a very beautiful palace, but at this time this situation is very bad. This is a focusing building, it can be a good attraction for tourism, the palace is a special thing that it is made of red sandstone.

References

Royal residences in India
Palaces in Rajasthan
Heritage hotels in India
Hindaun Block
12th-century establishments in India
Hindaun
Tourist attractions in Hindaun
Sandstone buildings in India